Sören Sommelius (born 1941) is a Swedish writer and journalist, working as editor of the culture section of the daily Helsingborgs Dagblad. He is the author of books on India (such as Indiens kämpande Kerala), and former Yugoslavia, among them Sista Resan till Jugoslavien (1992), Kosova utan stjärna (1993), Mediernas krig i forna Jugoslavien (1993), Mot kriget and Liten guide till stort krig (with Jan Öberg).

Sommelius is a member of the TFF Conflict-Mitigation Team and has studied, in particular, the role of media in ex-Yugoslavia and the war reporting by Western media. Numerous visits to all parts of former Yugoslavia, independently and as member of the TFF Conflict-Mitigation team, which he joined in 1992.

External links
 Blog at Helsingborgs Dagblad

Swedish male writers
Swedish journalists
Living people
1941 births